Llanpumpsaint was a railway station near the village of Llanpumpsaint, West Wales, serving the hamlet and the rural locale.

History
The Teifi Valley Railway was originally operated by the Carmarthen and Cardigan Railway between Carmarthen and Cynwyl Elfed. In 1864, the line was extended to Pencader and Llandysul. The line was purchased by the Great Western Railway (GWR) and extended to a terminus at Newcastle Emlyn in 1895.

Although passenger services ceased in 1965, goods services continued until 1973 because of the milk train services to the Co-operative Group creamery at Newcastle Emlyn. Although the station has been demolished the dismantled railway still passes through the village and, until recently, the original "Llanpumpsaint" station sign could be seen in front of the Railway Inn.

The Gwili Railway (Future Preservation) 

During the 1970s, A group of railway enthusiasts bought eight miles of the old trackbed. In neighbouring Bronwydd, a mile long section of the line was reopened in April 1978 for tourists and named the Gwili Railway.

Since Then, the line has been extend north to Danycoed Halt and the line will later re-opened South to Abergwili Junction in July 2017.

The Gwili Railway aims to eventually restore the railway, up the valley to Llanpumpsaint. Eight derelict bridges crossing the Gwili lie between Conwyl and Llanpumsaint, the cost of this restoration work is a major factor delaying the re-opening northwards to Llanpumpsaint.)

Notes

References
 
 Holden, John S. Holden (2007). The Manchester & Milford Railway. The Oakwood Press. .

External links
The Gwili Railway

Railway stations in Great Britain opened in 1864
Railway stations in Great Britain closed in 1965
Disused railway stations in Carmarthenshire
Beeching closures in Wales
Former Great Western Railway stations